Mohamed Fathallah Abdel Rahman (15 March 1915 – 12 May 1996) was an Egyptian épée and foil fencer. He competed at the 1936, 1948 and 1952 Summer Olympics.

References

External links
 

1915 births
1996 deaths
Egyptian male épée fencers
Egyptian male foil fencers
Olympic fencers of Egypt
Fencers at the 1936 Summer Olympics
Fencers at the 1948 Summer Olympics
Fencers at the 1952 Summer Olympics
20th-century Egyptian people